John Graham Cuckney, Baron Cuckney (12 July 1925 – 30 October 2008) was a British industrialist, civil servant and peer.

Early life and career
Born in India to Air Vice-Marshal E. J. Cuckney and his wife Lilian, Cuckney was educated at Shrewsbury School. He read medicine at the University of St Andrews, returning after service with the Royal Northumberland Fusiliers and the King's African Rifles during World War II to study history and economics. He was recruited by MI5, with whom he served until 1959. Cuckney's time in MI5 featured in Peter Wright's book Spycatcher, where Wright described him as "a tough, no-nonsense" officer.

Business and public service
After leaving MI5, he worked in the City at stockbroking firm Standard Industrial Group, before joining merchant bank Lazard, where he became the first director to resign in over 100 years. He then established Anglo-Eastern Bank with Sir David Alliance, specialising in trade finance between Britain and the Middle East.

Cuckney was appointed chairman of the Mersey Docks and Harbour Board in 1970, which he restructured and restored to viability following the possibility of insolvency. He left in 1972 to become the first chief executive of the Property Services Agency, set up to manage the government's property estate. In 1974 he moved to the Crown Agents, which was in financial difficulty following the secondary banking crisis of 1973–1975. He joined as chairman and separated out the military sales arm as International Military Services (a Ministry of Defence company), which he also became chairman of and served until 1985. He left the Crown Agents in 1978, and briefly joined the Port of London Authority before being knighted.

He subsequently became director and/or chairman of various companies, including travel company Thomas Cook, Midland Bank, tea company Brooke Bond, engineering firm John Brown, helicopter manufacturer Westland, Royal Insurance, Investors in Industry (later 3i), pharmaceutical company Glaxo, and Orion Publishing Group.

Westland affair and Maxwell scandal
Cuckney had gained a reputation as a "the company doctor who never lost a patient" following his involvement with the Mersey Docks and Harbour Board, Crown Agents, and John Brown. His appointment in 1985 as chairman of Westland, when the company was facing bankruptcy, saw him become involved in the 1985–1986 Westland affair, a political scandal for Margaret Thatcher's Conservative Party government. Cuckney, with Thatcher, favoured a merger with the American company Sikorsky, while the Secretary of State for Defence Michael Heseltine favoured a European merger. The American option prevailed, and the affair led to Heseltine's resignation.

In 1992 he was appointed as an advisor to Peter Lilley, Secretary of State for Social Security, following the death of Robert Maxwell and the discovery that he had stolen hundreds of millions of pounds from his companies' pension funds. He headed the Maxwell Pensioners' Trust and in 1995, brokered a £276 million out-of-court settlement, known as the Major Settlement, between the pension schemes and those institutions against which the schemes had potential legal claims.

He was created a life peer in 1995 as Baron Cuckney, of Millbank in the City of Westminster, sitting as a Conservative in the House of Lords.

Arms

References

1925 births
2008 deaths
People educated at Shrewsbury School
Alumni of the University of St Andrews
British Army personnel of World War II
MI5 personnel
British Crown Agents
Businesspeople awarded knighthoods
Civil servants in the Property Services Agency
20th-century British businesspeople
Knights Bachelor
Conservative Party (UK) life peers
Royal Northumberland Fusiliers officers
King's African Rifles officers
Life peers created by Elizabeth II